

Parliamentary elections

Summary of general election performances

By-elections, 2004–05

General election 2005 
The English Democrats contested 24 seats, receiving a total of 15149 votes, an average of 631 (range 221 to 1216). The percentage share of the vote ranged from 0.6% to 3.4%, with an average of 1.45%. No candidates were elected.

Source:

*Note the South Staffordshire election was postponed until 23 June due to the death of a candidate

By-elections, 2005–10

General election 2010 
The English Democrats stood 107 candidates in the 2010 general election.
(106 is the minimum number required to qualify for a Party Election Broadcast.) The EDP received 64,826 votes, or 0.3% of the vote in England, won only one deposit in Doncaster North with 5.2% and overall 0.2% of the vote in the United Kingdom. No candidates were elected.

* Williams has also contested the London region for the Christian Peoples Alliance in the 2014 European elections, Old Bexley & Sidcup for the Christian Party in the 2015 general election, in Sidcup for the Liberal Party in the 2018 local election and Vale of Glamorgan for Gwlad Gwlad in the 2019 general election.

Source for results:

By-elections, 2010–15

General election 2015 

Source:

By-elections, 2015–17

General election 2017

General election 2019

By-elections, 2019–present

European Parliament elections

Summary of European election performance in the UK 

Note: The English Democrats never stood in Scotland or Wales in the European elections although the results are displayed as a proportion of the GB results. (Northern Ireland has a different electoral system).

London mayoral elections

Winston McKenzie filed paperwork to appear on the ballot in 2016, but the paperwork was declared invalid.

London Assembly elections

English Police Commissioner elections

2012

2016

2021

Welsh Assembly elections

2007 National Assembly for Wales election 
Source: BBC News
Due to the English Democrats stance on the status of Monmouthshire, the English Democrats stood in the three constituencies in Monmouthshire and in the South Wales East region. They came 16th place nationwide with 0.2% of the vote.

2011 National Assembly for Wales election 
Source: BBC News
The English Democrats stood five candidates in the South Wales East region and contested only one individual constituency, Monmouth. The vote in Monmouth fell by 0.2% but regional vote increased by 0.2%. They came 11th place nationwide with 0.1% of the vote.

2016 National Assembly for Wales election 
The party stood 1 candidate in the Monmouth constituency, and none in any electoral regions.

Combined authority mayoral elections

2017

2018

2021

Metropolitan borough mayoral elections

London borough mayoral elections

London local elections

2006

2010

2014

2018

Metropolitan borough local elections

2004

Source: Local Elections Archive Project

2006

Source: Local Elections Archive Project

2007

Source: Local Elections Archive Project

2008

Source: Local Elections Archive Project

2010

Source: Local Elections Archive Project

2011

Source: Local Elections Archive Project

2012

Source: Local Elections Archive Project

2014

Source: Local Elections Archive Project

2015

Source: Local Elections Archive Project

2016

Source: Local Elections Archive Project

2018

Source: Local Elections Archive Project

2019

Source: Local Elections Archive Project

2021

2022

References

Election results by party in the United Kingdom
Elections results